Le Cannet (older ) is a commune of the Alpes-Maritimes department in southeastern France.

Administration
Le Cannet was part of Cannes until 1778, when it was made a separate commune.

Location
Le Cannet is located in the north of Cannes, on the French Riviera, approximately 2 kilometers from the Mediterranean Sea. The two cities form a single urban area. It has a typical Mediterranean climate. Being well located, protected by numerous pine covered hills allows the city to benefit from a form of micro-climate, defined by its low level of humidity and ice, even during winter. These characteristics have made it a particularly appreciated part of the region

Population

Personalities
Le Cannet was the birthplace of:
 Victorien Sardou (1831–1908), dramatist
 Richard Galliano (born 1950), accordionist
 François Garde (born 1959), High-ranking official and writer

It was the home of:
 Margaret Caroline Anderson, editor of The Little Review
 Pierre Bonnard, painter

It is the home of:
 Patrick Tambay, former Formula 1 driver and City Councillor of Le Cannet

Twin towns
Le Cannet is twinned with:
 Benidorm, Spain
 Königstein im Taunus, Germany
 Lafayette, United States
 Magione, Italy
 Vila do Conde, Portugal

See also
 Communes of the Alpes-Maritimes department

References

External links

 Le Cannet city council website

Communes of Alpes-Maritimes
French Riviera
Alpes-Maritimes communes articles needing translation from French Wikipedia